Eugenio Recuenco (born 1968) is a photographer from Madrid, Spain, who works mostly in the publishing and advertising fields. Compared to others, his personal style has been referred to as "cinematographic" and "pictorial".  His work has been featured in magazines such as Vogue, Madame Figaro and Twill.

He is also one of two directors for Rammstein's music video for Mein Herz brennt; the other director being Zoran Bihać.

References

External links
 Official website
 About Eugenio Recuenco, recopillation of its latest photos and videos
 Examples of work in online magazine Bertha Mag
 Entrevista a Eugenio Recuenco en CYAN mag #9 (2010)

Living people
Spanish photographers
1968 births